Paul Ward may refer to:

Paul Ward (footballer) (born 1963), English footballer
Paul John Ward (born 1964), British racing car driver
Paul Joseph Ward (born 1964), historian
Paul Langdon Ward (1911–2005), American academic, fifth president of Sarah Lawrence College
Paul W. Ward, American journalist
Paul "Hippo" Ward, Irish gangster convicted and later found innocent on appeal of the murder of Veronica Guerin